The Rovetta massacre is the name given to the summary execution of 43 Italian soldiers that took place in Rovetta on the night of 27–28 April 1945. The soldiers were of the 1ª Divisione d'Assalto "M" della Legione Tagliamento, part of the National Republican Guard of the Italian Social Republic.

The surrender 
At the end of October 1943, the 1ª Divisione d'Assalto "M" Tagliamento was transferred to Brescia, more particularly to Val Camonica, with orders to defend the lines of communication of the Wehrmacht and the construction sites of the Organisation Todt, and to engage groups of partisans. Territorial contiguity meant that its presence also extended to the Province of Bergamo. On 26 April 1945 a group from the military garrison on the route known as the Cantoniera della Presolana commanded by Sub-lieutenant Roberto Panzanelli heard over the radio that the Nazi Fascist regime had surrendered; they accordingly decided to abandon their garrison and head for Bergamo. They set off along the valley, led by Alessandro Franceschetti carrying a white flag; he was the hotelkeeper with whom they had been billeted on the Pass of Presolana. Upon reaching Rovetta they decided to lay down their arms and surrender to the local National Liberation Committee (NLC); the latter agreed that they be treated as prisoners of war with all the attendant safeguards. Sub-lieutenant Panzanelli signed a document to this effect and had it countersigned by the parish priest, Don Bravi, a member of the NLC of Maggiore Pacifico, and others.
This committee was self-proclaimed but its guarantees were worthless – a fact unbeknown to Panzanelli. The soldiers laid down their arms and were moved to the village school pending transfer to the jurisdiction of the Italian state or to the armies of the allied forces.

Execution by firing squad 
On 28 April a group of partisans belonging to the 53ª Brigata Garibaldi Tredici Martiri, the Brigata Camozzi and the Brigate Fiamme Verdi arrived in the village and took the soldiers from the school to a point near the local cemetery. On the way, one of the prisoners, Fernando Caciolo, managed to escape and hide, finally taking refuge in the house of the priest, Don Bravi, where he stayed for three months before returning to his home village, Anagni. Sub-lieutenant Panzanelli offered up the signed documents showing their guarantee of status as prisoners of war, but it was torn up and trampled underfoot. At the cemetery two firing squads were formed and 43 of the prisoners, all between 15 and 22 years of age, were shot.
Three men were spared on account of their youth. One of the men, 20-year-old Giuseppe Mancini, the last to be shot, was forced to take part in the execution of his comrades. It later became known that Mancini was the son of Edvige Mussolini, the sister of Benito Mussolini.

The victims
The following is a list of the victims, alphabetically by surname, with their ages and towns:

 Fernando Andrisano, 22, Brindisi
 Antonio Aversa, 19, Ceccano
 Vincenzo Balsamo, 17, Ficulle
 Carlo Banci, 15, Roma
 Fiorino Bettineschi, 18, Borno
 Alfredo Bulgarelli, 17, Forli
 Bartolomeo Valerio Gazzaniga, 21, Varenna
 Carlo Cavagna, 19, Roma
 Fernando Cristini, 21, Corana
 Silvano Dell'Armi, 16, Roma
 Bruno Dilzeni, 20, Carpendolo
 Romano Ferlan, 18, Fiume
 Antonio Fontana, 20, Ghibellina
 Vincenzo Fontana, 19, Roma
 Giuseppe Foresti, 18, Credano
 Bruno Fraia, 19, Fiume
 Ferruccio Gallozzi, 19, Roma
 Francesco Garofalo, 19, Latina
 Giovanni Gerra, 18, San Venzano
 Mario Giorgi, 16, Tolmezzo
 Balilla Grippaudo, 20, Roma
 Franco Lagna, 17, Collegno
 Enrico Marino, 20, Tonco
 Giuseppe Mancini, 20, Premilcuore
 Giovanni Martinelli, 20, Dosolo
 Roberto Panzanelli, 22, Ficulle
 Stefano Pennacchio, 18, Roma
 Mario Pielucci, 17, Roma
 Guido Piovaticci, 17, Roma
 Alfredo Pizzitutti, 17, Gibellina
 Alvaro Porcarelli, 20, Matelica
 Vittorio Rampini, 19, Rome
 Giuseppe Randi, 18, Sulmona
 Mario Randi, 16, Sulmona
 Sergio Rasi, 17, Roma
 Ettore Solari, 20, La Spezia
 Bruno Taffurelli, 21
 Italo Terranera, 19, Rome
 Pietro Uccellini, 19, San Venzano
 Luigi Umena, 20, Ficulle
 Carlo Villa, 19, Monza
 Aldo Zarrelli, 19, Tivoli
 Franco Zolli, 16, Roma

Responsibility for the massacre 
The responsibility for the massacre was attributed to Slovenian-born Paolo Poduje, known by the code name of Moicano, a member of the Special Operations Executive (SOE). It was he who gave the order for the soldiers to be removed from the school and executed. The identity of Moicano remained unknown for many decades but witness statements and documents produced at the subsequent trial showed that he had been parachuted to near Pizzo Formico at the beginning of April 1945 as a captain in the Intelligence Corps under the command of Count Manfred Beckett Czernin. His task was to make contact with partisan groups in the area, in particular with the group known as Giustizia e Libertà. Theories that Poduje was responsible for the summary execution at Rovetta were confirmed when Moicano admitted at the beginning of the 21st century that he had indeed ordered the shooting of soldiers of the Italian Social Republic.

The trial 
The Italian public prosecutor at Bergamo opened criminal proceedings in 1946. However, in 1951 it was concluded that no one could be found guilty as the summary execution was deemed not to have been a crime but an act of war. This decision was based on the fact that the official occupation of the Province of Bergamo ceased on 1 May 1945.  Poduje died July 8, 1999.

See also 
 National Liberation Committee for Northern Italy
 National Republican Guard (Italy)

Sources 
 Angelo Bendotti e Elisabetta Ruffini, Gli ultimi fuochi: 28 April 1945, a Rovetta, Bergamo, Il filo di Arianna (2008).
 Giuliano Fiorani, Onore – Una strage: perché?, Grafica MA.RO (2005).
 Lodovico Galli, L'eccidio di Rovetta: 28 April 1945 una spietata rappresaglia nella Bergamasca, Montichiari, Zanetto (1994), p. 185.
 Massimo Lucioli e Davide Sabatini, Rovetta 1945, Settimo Sigillo (2001).
 Nazareno Marinoni, La terrazza sul cortile. I fatti di Rovetta del 28 April 1945 nei ricordi di un bambino, Bergamo, Il filo di Arianna (2005).
 Carlo Mazzantini, I Balilla andarono a Salò, Venezia, Marsilio (1997).
 Gianpaolo Pansa, Il sangue dei vinti, Milano, Sperling & Kupfer editore (2003), pp. 193–206.
 Grazia Spada, Il Moicano e i fatti di Rovetta, Milano, Medusa Edizioni (2008).

References

1945 in Italy
April 1945 events in Europe
Massacres in 1945
Massacres in the Italian Social Republic
Massacres in Italy
World War II massacres
Italian resistance movement
Mass murder in 1945